Teddy is a masculine nickname or given name.

Teddy or TEDDY may also refer to:

Arts and entertainment
 Teddy (album), an album by Teddy Pendergrass
 Teddy (film), an Indian animated film
 Teddy (musical), a 1956 British stage musical
 "Teddy" (story), a story by J. D. Salinger in Nine Stories
 Teddy Award, an international film award for films with LGBT topics

Science and technology
 Terminology for the Description of Dynamics, an ontology in systems biology
 The Environmental Determinants of Diabetes in the Young, a study examining causes of juvenile diabetes
 Teddy, a Guinea pig breed

Other uses
 Teddy bear, a type of toy bear
 Teddy (cigarette), a Norwegian brand
 Teddy (dog), an American canine film performer, active 1915–1924
 Teddy (horse), a racehorse
 Teddy (garment), a form of bodysuit-style garment
 Teddy, Kentucky, an unincorporated community in the US
 Teddy Air, a defunct Norwegian regional airline
 Teddy Stadium, a football stadium in Jerusalem named after Teddy Kollek
 Teddy Award, issued by the Canadian Taxpayers Federation for examples of high taxes and government waste

See also
 Teddy Boy, a phenomenon in youth culture since the 1950s
 Teddy Grahams, a bear shaped graham cracker snacks
 Tedi (disambiguation)
 Teddy bear (disambiguation)